The Perthshire Amateur Football Association (PAFA) is a football league competition for amateur clubs in the Perthshire area of Scotland.  The association is affiliated to the Scottish Amateur Football Association.

The association has two divisions.

League membership
In order to join the association, clubs need to apply and are then voted in by current member clubs.

2022/2023 league members

Division One

Alyth
Burrelton
Breadalbane
Fair City
Jeanfield Swifts
Letham Community
Luncarty ASC
Kettins
Rattray
Vale of Earn

Division Two

Abernethy AFC
Auchterarder Primrose
Ballinluig
Balmoral
Bridgeton
FC Romania
Kinrossie Caledonian
Stanley
St Johns
Vale of Atholl
Wolfhill

Current Champions

Division One 

Kettins

Division Two 

Fair City

Ashleigh Cup 

Contested by all teams in PAFA.

Atholl Cup 

Contested Between
 Ballinluig
 Breadalbane
 Vale of Atholl

Birks Cup 

Contested Between
 Ballinluig
 Breadalbane
 Vale of Atholl

Perthshire Cup 

Contested by all teams in PAFA.

Smith League Cup 

Contested by all teams in PAFA.

West & District Cup 

Contested Between
 Auchterarder Primrose
 Luncarty ASC
 Vale of Earn

External links
Perthshire AFA League Website

Football leagues in Scotland
Football in Perth and Kinross
Amateur association football in Scotland